Subin is one of the constituencies represented in the Parliament of Ghana. It elects one Member of Parliament (MP) by the first past the post system of election

Eugene Boakye Antwi is the member of parliament for the constituency. He was elected on the ticket of the New Patriotic Party (NPP) and re-elected to become the MP after 40903 votes. He succeeded Isaac Osei who had represented the constituency also on the ticket of the NPP.

See also
List of Ghana Parliament constituencies

References 

Parliamentary constituencies in the Ashanti Region